Kripa is a Hindic given name that may refer to
Kripa Ram Barath, Rajasthani poet 
Kripa Sagar (1875–1939), Punjabi poet
Kripa Shankar Patel Bishnoi (born 1977), Indian professional wrestler and coach
Kripa Shankar Sharma, Hindi poet 
Kripashankar Singh, Indian politician

Indian masculine given names